Tillore Khurd is a village located in the Indore district of Madhya Pradesh, India. It is also a gram panchayat according to 2009 stats and situated 15km away from Indore,which is both a district & sub-district headquarter of Tillor Khurd village.

History
The history of Tillore dates back to at least the 16th-century. Then, it was described as a village in Kampel Pargana of the Mughal Empire..Tillore is surrounded by Mundla Dosdar , Joshi Guradiya , Shivnagar , Umariya Khurd , Asrawad Khurd in different directions.

Economy 
The village is a center of agriculture and trade in the Indore district. Tillore Khurd is a center for milk production and dairy farms.
Villages in Indore district